Essendon Keilor College was founded in 1992 from the amalgamation of Queens Park Secondary College (formerly Essendon Technical School), Essendon High School, Niddrie High School and Keilor Heights Secondary College.

Essendon Keilor College (current enrolment approx 1800) is a multi-campus college providing state education primarily to students from the North and West of Melbourne. The College consists of two Junior Campuses located at Keilor and Niddrie and one Senior Campus located at Essendon.

The Essendon Keilor College uniform is a white coloured shirt with the symbol of the school on the left chest and dark blue coloured pants. A dark blue jumper with the school symbol is worn in winter.

Campuses

Niddrie 
The Niddrie Campus is located in Airport West at the end of Peters Street and is directly beside Niddrie Primary School. It serves from Year 7 to Year 9. It was Niddrie High School until it became part of Essendon Keilor College in 1992.

Between 1994 and 2015, Western Autistic School ran a program for adolescents called the Baseroom out of a room at the campus. Due to budget cuts, the program closed down at the end of the 2015 school year.

Prior to joining Essendon Keilor College the boy's uniform consisted of grey jean slacks, a light blue shirt with a navy blue print of a planet splitting in the middle and a jumper with the same pattern but reverse colours.

Keilor East 
The East Keilor Campus is located in East Keilor on Quinn Grove, next to the East Keilor Leisure Centre. It also serves Year 7 to Year 9. The school was known as Keilor Heights High School from 1968 to 1992.

The old Keilor Heights High School uniform consisted of grey slacks and a light blue shirt for boys, while girls wore a light blue dress or navy skirt, both checked with red, yellow, green and blue. The navy school jumper bore the school's logo of an open book and the motto 'Seek the Highest'.

Essendon 
The Essendon Campus is located in Essendon at 286-290 Buckley Street. This campus serves Year 10, 11 and 12 students, and features specialised facilities for VCE studies.

Before becoming part of Essendon Keilor College in 1992 the school was called Essendon High School. The Federation Style school quadrangle, designed in 1910 and constructed between 1912-1913, was the first purpose-built high school building in metropolitan Melbourne. Both the quadrangle and the Georgian Revival school hall (constructed 1925-1926) are classified by the National Trust

Notable alumni

Tash Sultana, musician
Tom Sheridan, Australian rules footballer
Ryan Crowley, Australian rules footballer
Shaun McKernan, Australian rules footballer
Andrew Welsh, Australian rules footballer
Jeremy Laidler, Australian rules footballer
Brent Reilly, Australian rules footballer
Lynden Dunn, Australian rules footballer
Paul Ahern, Australian rules footballer
Kyle Hartigan, Australian rules footballer
Mitch Banner, Australian rules footballer
Callum Moore (Australian footballer)
Corey Ellis, Australian rules footballer

Essendon High School
Barry Davis, Australian rules footballer
Brian Fitzpatrick (Australian author), historian, civil libertarian
Ken Fletcher, Australian rules footballer
James Housden, bishop
Clare Stevenson, inaugural Director of the Women's Auxiliary Australian Air Force
Alan Villiers, author and adventurer
Tim Watson, Australian rules footballer, sports commentator

References and external links
School homepage

Essendon Keilor College
Educational institutions established in 1992
1992 establishments in Australia
Essendon, Victoria
Buildings and structures in the City of Moonee Valley